Mecodema allani is a ground beetle of the family Carabidae, endemic to the South Island, New Zealand. It is one of two species within the laterale group, which are large-bodied species with a distinctively broad lateral carina along the elytra that is reflexed (curved upward).

References

External links
 
 
 iNaturalist World Checklist

Beetles of New Zealand
allani
Endemic fauna of New Zealand
Beetles described in 1945
Endemic insects of New Zealand